Vivianne Simone Fock Tave is a Seychellois Principal Secretary of Foreign Affairs in the Ministry of Foreign Affairs and Tourism. She is the daughter of Gontran Fock Tave and Agnezina Fock Tave (née Belle).

In 2015, Fock Tave became the ambassador to the People’s Republic of China.

In 2010, she was accredited as Ambassador to the Netherlands and Luxembourg. In 2012, she became the first Ambassador to Hungary from the Seychelles.

She was the Ambassador of Seychelles to Belgium and the European Union. She was also Ambassador of Seychelles to the Vatican and is the first female Seychelles Ambassador to occupy this role. She speaks Seychellois Creole, English, German and French.

References

Living people
Seychellois women diplomats
Ambassadors of Seychelles to Belgium
Ambassadors of Seychelles to the European Union
Ambassadors of Seychelles to the Holy See
Women ambassadors
Year of birth missing (living people)
Ambassadors of Seychelles to China
Ambassadors of Seychelles to Luxembourg
Ambassadors of Seychelles to the Netherlands
Ambassadors of Seychelles to Hungary